Bucchich's goby (Gobius bucchichi) is a species of goby native to the Eastern Mediterranean Sea (at least the Adriatic and Aegean Seas) and perhaps the Black Sea. It has traditionally been considered to be more widespread, but in 2016 the similar incognito goby (G. incognitus) was described. It had been confused with the Bucchich's goby and much information formerly published for this species is now considered to actually be for the incognito goby.

Its diet consists of polychaete worms, amphipods, molluscs and algae.

References

External links
 

Gobius
Fish of the Adriatic Sea
Fish of the Mediterranean Sea
Fish of the Black Sea
Fish of Europe
Fish described in 1870